In the Hungarian language the essive-formal case combines the essive case and the formal case, and it can express the position, task, state (e.g. "as a tourist"), or the manner (e.g. "like a hunted animal").

The status of the suffix  in the declension system is disputed for several reasons. First, in general, Hungarian case suffixes are absolute word-final, while  permits further suffixation by the locative
suffix . Second, most Hungarian case endings participate in vowel harmony, while  does not. For these reasons, many modern analyses of the Hungarian case system, starting with László Antal's "" (1961) do not consider the essive-formal to be a case.

References

Grammatical cases